John O'Hara (1905–1970) was an American writer of Appointment in Samarra, Butterfield 8, and many short stories.

John O'Hara may also refer to:

 John O'Hara (Brooklyn politician), American lawyer 
 John O'Hara (racing driver), driver for A1 Team Ireland in the A1 Grand Prix
 John O'Hara (musician), English keyboardist and conductor, currently member of Jethro Tull
 John O'Hara (singer), leader of O'Hara's Playboys (a Glasgow band in the 1960s-1970s)  
 John O'Hara (soccer, born 1959), American soccer defender
 John O'Hara (footballer, born 1981), Irish professional soccer goalkeeper
 John O'Hara (American football) (1944–1992), American college football coach
 John O'Hara (wrestler) (1913–1983), Australian Olympic wrestler
 Sir John Ailbe O'Hara, Northern Ireland High Court judge
 John Bernard O'Hara (1862–1927), Australian poet and schoolmaster
 John Francis O'Hara (1888–1960), American archbishop and cardinal
 John Joseph O'Hara (born 1946), American prelate of the Roman Catholic Church
 John Myers O'Hara (1870–1944), American poet
 Jack O'Hara (John James O'Hara, 1866–1931), Australian rules footballer who